Sha cha beef (also called sa cha beef, cha beef, or cha beefsteak) is the name of a Chinese dish featuring shacha sauce and tenderized beef strips. The Americanized dish is usually served over a bed of white rice with fresh scallions and cilantro (coriander). This dish is native to the Gansu province of China.

Sha cha beef is a traditional dish dating back thousands of years. This dish is unusual in that it is one of the few Chinese-American dishes to maintain the principle of fan-ts'ai or the division between fan, grains and other starch foods, and ts'ai, vegetable and meat dishes. To prepare a balanced meal, it must have an appropriate amount of both fan and ts'ai, and ingredients are readied along both tracks.

See also
 List of steak dishes

References

External links
Recipe for Sha Cha Beef

American Chinese cuisine
Beef dishes